Gerhard Bauch from the Hamburg University of Technology was named Fellow of the Institute of Electrical and Electronics Engineers (IEEE) in 2015 "for contributions to iterative processing in multiple-input multiple-output systems".

References 

Fellow Members of the IEEE
Living people
Year of birth missing (living people)
Academic staff of the Hamburg University of Technology
Place of birth missing (living people)